Protection is the second studio album by English electronic music group Massive Attack, released on 26 September 1994 by Wild Bunch Records and Circa. DJ Mad Professor remixed the album in 1995 under the name No Protection.

Composition

Like most of Massive Attack's albums, the music often defies categorisation, ranging from R&B (title track and "Sly") to hip hop/rap ("Karmacoma" and "Eurochild") to reggae-tinged synth-pop ("Spying Glass") to classical-influenced electronica instrumentals ("Weather Storm" and "Heat Miser"). The album follows Blue Lines structurally, to the point that the font used on the cover of the album is the same, Helvetica Heavy Italic. The album cover also nods to Blue Lines, revealing a futuristic, impenetrable wall behind a mostly-burned version of this previous album's artwork—implying that the depicted "flammable gas" had been ignited.

Tricky again appeared on the album, rapping on the tracks "Karmacoma" (whose video was directed by Jonathan Glazer, and which featured a sample from The KLF's "Dream Time in Lake Jackson" at the 2:00-minute mark) and "Eurochild" (which featured samples from Startled Insects' "Cheetah" and Liquid Liquid's "Lock Groove (In)").

Reception

Paul Evans of Rolling Stone wrote, "Cool, sexy stuff, it smoothly fuses dub, club and soul, grounding its grace in sampled hip-hop beats."

In 2011, Rolling Stone ranked Protection at number 51 on its list of the "100 Best Albums of the Nineties". The album is also listed in the book 1001 Albums You Must Hear Before You Die.

As of February 2010, the album had sold 292,000 copies in the United States, according to Nielsen SoundScan.

Track listing

Sample credits
 "Weather Storm" contains samples from "It's Time for Love" by Pieces of a Dream.
 "Better Things" contains samples from "Never Can Say Goodbye" by James Brown.
 "Light My Fire" (live) contains samples from "Light My Fire" by Young-Holt Unlimited.

Personnel
Credits adapted from the liner notes of Protection.

Musicians

 Massive Attack, Marius de Vries, Andy Wright, The Insects, Nick Warren – programming
 Tracey Thorn – vocals 
 3D – vocals 
 Tricky – vocals 
 Nicolette – vocals 
 Craig Armstrong – piano ; arrangement, conducting 
 Horace Andy – vocals 
 Chester Kamen – guitar 
 Rob Merril – drums 
 Daddy G – vocals

Technical
 Nellee Hooper – production, mixing ; mix engineering 
 Massive Attack – production, mixing
 Mark "Spike" Stent – mix engineering 
 Jim Abbiss – mix engineering 
 Jeremy "Jim Bob" Wheatley – additional engineering
 Al Stone – additional engineering
 Mike Marsh – mastering

Artwork
 Massive Attack, Michael-Nash Assoc. – artwork
 Matthew Donaldson, Jean-Baptiste Mondino, Eddie Monsoon – photography

Charts

Certifications

References

External links
 
 

1994 albums
Albums produced by Nellee Hooper
Massive Attack albums